The 2012–13 Bucknell Bison men's basketball team represented Bucknell University during the 2012–13 NCAA Division I men's basketball season. The Bison, led by fifth year head coach Dave Paulsen, played their home games at Sojka Pavilion and were members of the Patriot League. They finished the season 28–6, 12–2 in Patriot League play to be crowned regular season champions. They were also champions of the Patriot League tournament to earn an automatic bid to the 2013 NCAA tournament where they lost in the second round to Butler.

Roster

Schedule

|-
!colspan=9| Regular season

|-
!colspan=9| 2013 Patriot League men's basketball tournament

|-
!colspan=9| 2013 NCAA tournament

References

Bucknell Bison men's basketball seasons
Bucknell
Bucknell
Bucknell Bison
Bucknell Bison